The Praga Hostivař D was a four-cylinder, air-cooled, horizontally opposed aircraft engine first produced in Czechoslovakia in 1936 but which enjoyed its greatest success after World War II due to the explosion in popularity of sports flying. A version for helicopters was produced post World War II as the Praga DH

Applications
Mráz M-2 Skaut
Aero XE-II
 IFIL-Reghin RG-6 (1957)

Specifications (Praga D)

See also

References

Further reading

 

Boxer engines
1930s aircraft piston engines